Aylin Yıldızoğlu (born February 13, 1975 in İzmir, Turkey) is a Turkish female basketball player.

Career
Aylin played 13 years for Ceyhan Municipality and then for Botaş Spor. In 2003, she won three titles with Botaş Spor in one season, Turkish Women's Basketball League championship, Turkey Cup and President’s Cup. In summer 2005, the captain of Botaş Spor transferred back to Ceyhan Municipality.

International career
Yıldızoğlu played in the gold medal winning national team at the 2005 Mediterranean Games in Almería, Spain.

Personal life
Since 1999, she is married to Ceyhun Yıldızoğlu, coach of Botaş Spor women’s team.

See also
 Turkish women in sports

References

1975 births
Sportspeople from İzmir
Living people
Turkish women's basketball players
Botaş SK players